Marvin Stefaniak (born 3 February 1995) is a German professional footballer who plays as a midfielder for  club Erzgebirge Aue.

Career

Beginnings and Dynamo Dresden
Stefaniak began his career as a youth with SC Borea Dresden before joining Dynamo Dresden in 2011. He was promoted to the first team two years later, and made his debut in February 2014, as a substitute for Adam Sušac in a 3–2 defeat to FSV Frankfurt in the 2. Bundesliga.

VfL Wolfsburg
On 14 September 2016, VfL Wolfsburg announced the signing of Stefaniak from Dynamo Dresden for the following season for a transfer fee of €2 million. On 1 July 2017, Stefaniak left Dynamo Dresden to join his new club, Wolfsburg.

In May 2019, Greuther Fürth signed Stefaniak on a two-season loan deal. Following a largely underwhelming first season, Fürth tried to end the loan prematurely in July 2020, but was denied.

On 5 October 2020, the last day of the 2020 summer transfer window, Stefaniak re-joined former club Dynamo Dresden on loan for the 2020–21 season. His loan to Greuther Fürth was cut short.

Würzburger Kickers
On 17 January 2022, Stefaniak joined Würzburger Kickers. He made 14 league appearances for the club, as they suffered relegation to the Regionalliga Bayern.

Erzgebirge Aue
Stefaniak moved to 3. Liga club Erzgebirge Aue on 3 June 2022, signing a one-year deal with an option for an additional season.

Career statistics

References

External links

1995 births
Living people
People from Hoyerswerda
Association football midfielders
German footballers
Germany youth international footballers
Germany under-21 international footballers
Dynamo Dresden II players
Dynamo Dresden players
VfL Wolfsburg players
1. FC Nürnberg players
SpVgg Greuther Fürth players
Würzburger Kickers players
FC Erzgebirge Aue players
2. Bundesliga players
3. Liga players
Regionalliga players
Footballers from Saxony